A muggle is a person without magical abilities in the Harry Potter series.

Otherwise, it has been used in a number of groups and fields to refer to an outsider, non-initiate, or one lacking basic knowledge of the field.

Muggle may also refer to:
 "Muggles", a 1928 tune recorded by Louis Armstrong and His Orchestra (the word originating from a slang term for cannabis)
 Muggles, a character in the children's book The Gammage Cup
 Muggles, a race in the book The Legend of Rah and the Muggles
 A slang term for cannabis (users are "muggle-heads")
 A person who is not privy to the game of Geocaching

See also
 Muggletonianism
 Muggle-Wump

de:Begriffe der Harry-Potter-Romane#Muggel
it:Glossario di Harry Potter#B